Q: Are We Not Men? A: We Are Devo! is the debut studio album by the American new wave band Devo. It was originally released in August 1978 on the Warner Bros. label (Virgin Records in Europe). Produced by Brian Eno, the album was recorded between October 1977 and February 1978, primarily in Cologne, West Germany.

The album received somewhat mixed reviews from critics and peaked at No. 78 on the U.S. Billboard chart and No. 12 on the UK Albums Chart. Recent reviews of the album have been more uniformly positive and the album has been included on several retrospective "best of" lists from publications including Rolling Stone, Pitchfork, and Spin.

On May 6, 2009, Devo performed the album live in its entirety for the first time as part of the Don't Look Back concert series curated by All Tomorrow's Parties. On September 16, 2009, Warner Bros. and Devo announced a re-release of Q: Are We Not Men? and Freedom of Choice, with a tour performing both albums.

Production and recording

Writing 
Mark Mothersbaugh, Gerald Casale, and Bob Mothersbaugh wrote the album over three years between 1974 and 1977. "Jocko Homo" (written by Mark) was demoed in 1974 and was first played live on October 31, 1975. During this period, Devo were a quartet consisting of Mark Mothersbaugh, Gerald Casale, Bob Mothersbaugh, and Jim Mothersbaugh. In 1976, Alan Myers replaced Jim Mothersbaugh as the group's drummer, and Bob Casale re-joined as rhythm guitarist and additional keyboardist following a two-year absence. By February 1977, Devo were also performing "Shrivel Up" live as well as early versions of "Uncontrollable Urge," "Praying Hands," "Mongoloid," "Too Much Paranoias," and an over seven-minute version of "Jocko Homo." In March 1977, Devo released their first single, a self-produced version of "Mongoloid" / "Jocko Homo".

By May 19, 1977, the group had debuted all of the album's tracks live, and would continue to develop the material throughout the year.

Production 
In 1977, David Bowie and Iggy Pop received a tape of Devo demo songs from the wife of Michael Aylward, guitarist in another Akron, Ohio, band, Tin Huey. Both Pop and Bowie, as well as Brian Eno and Robert Fripp, expressed interest in producing Devo's first release.  In October 1977, Patrick Gleeson invited to record the tracks "Come Back Jonee" and "Shrivel-Up" at Different Fur Studios, in San Francisco, California. The following month, Devo returned to New York City and were introduced ahead of a show at Max's Kansas City by David Bowie, who told the audience that he planned to produce Devo's first album in Tokyo over the winter.

Eventually, Eno was chosen to produce the album at Conny Plank's studio located near Cologne, Germany. The band were flown to Germany in February 1978. Bowie was busy with filming Just a Gigolo but helped Eno produce the record during weekends. Since Devo was without a record deal, Eno paid for the flights and studio cost for the band, confident that the band would be signed to a record contract. In return for his work on the album, Eno asked for a share of any subsequent deals. The earlier takes of "Come Back Jonee" and "Shrivel Up" had been overdubbed during these sessions.

Gerald Casale was not present for the first day of recording, as he had missed the flight. With their bassist missing, the group spent the first day playing with Eno, Bowie, Holger Czukay and Dieter Moebius.

The recording sessions were a source of frustration for Eno and Devo. Eno found the band unwilling to experiment or deviate from their early demonstrations of recorded songs. Devo later admitted that "we were overtly resistant to Eno's ideas. He made up synth parts and really cool sounds for almost every part of the album, but we used them on three or four songs." After conflicts arose between the group and Eno, David Bowie was brought in to remix the album.

Outtakes from the album include: "Be Stiff", released as a non album single that same year; "Social Fools", released as the B-side to "Come Back Jonee"; and "Penetration in the Centrefold", released as the B-side to "The Day My Baby Gave Me a Surprize" in 1979.

Artwork and packaging
The cover was illustrated by Joe Heiner. It was based on an image of the famous professional golfer Juan "Chi-Chi" Rodríguez that the band had found on a golf strap. According to Casale, David Berman, Senior Vice President of business affairs at their record label, Warner Bros., decided that the image could not be used because "he was a golf fan and felt we were making fun of Chi Chi." The band offered to contact Rodriguez personally but had time constraints, due to the forthcoming production of their album. The manager of the company's art department, Rick Serini, recommended an artist who could airbrush and alter the face of the picture, while lead singer Mark Mothersbaugh offered a picture he'd procured from a local newspaper that morphed the faces of U.S. presidents John F. Kennedy, Lyndon B. Johnson, Richard Nixon and Gerald Ford. These ideas were later morphed with the original "Chi Chi" Rodriguez image to create the cover art of the album.

The band did eventually get Rodriguez's permission to use the original photograph. Since the "morphed" album sleeves were already in production by that time, Serini claimed it would cost the band $2,500 to halt production and reinstate the image intended originally by the band, which forced the band to keep the morphed version. According to Casale, "we were able to come out with something that by the corporate interference and misunderstanding of the business side of Warner Bros. Records, actually unwittingly produced something far more Devo than the original [image]." The original cover illustration, with Rodriguez's face intact, turned up on the picture sleeve for the band's third single, "Be Stiff".

The European version has completely different artwork and, like the American version's inner sleeve, had photographs taken from the music video for "Jocko Homo". The front cover of the European version depicts a man (Mark Mothersbaugh) wearing goggles, bow tie, and rubber gloves, while the back cover features heads (Gerald Casale, Jim Mothersbaugh, and Bob Mothersbaugh) with sunglasses under nylon stockings.

Release
Devo received offers to release Q: Are We Not Men? A: We Are Devo! from Warner Bros., Island, Virgin and David Bowie's production company, Bewlay Brothers. Virgin obtained the rights to release the album in the United Kingdom, while Warner Bros. held the rights for North America. The album was originally planned for a spring 1978 release, but had to be delayed due to legal disputes between Warner and Virgin. It was eventually released by Warner in the United States on August 28, 1978, and by Virgin in the United Kingdom on September 1, 1978. Virgin also released a picture disc version of the album, illustrated with a still from the band's 1976 short film The Truth About De-Evolution.

In North America, Q: Are We Not Men? A: We Are Devo! peaked at No. 78 on the Billboard charts, while in the United Kingdom it entered the charts on September 16, 1978, and remained there for seven weeks, peaking at No. 12. Q: Are We Not Men? A: We Are Devo! was also successful in Japan.

The album's opening track, "Uncontrollable Urge", has been used in several films and television shows, including The Wolf of Wall Street, Fun with Dick and Jane, Ridiculousness (as a cover along with Mark Mothersbaugh and "yeahs" provided by Rob Dyrdek) and Jackass.

Critical reception

Initial critical reaction to Q: Are We Not Men? A: We Are Devo! was somewhat mixed. Tom Carson, writing in Rolling Stone, claimed that "There's not an ounce of feeling anywhere, and the only commitment is to the distancing aesthetic of the put-on", and opined that "Devo lacks most of Eno's warmth and much of Bowie's flair for mechanized melodrama. For all its idiosyncrasies, the music here is utterly impersonal." Robert Christgau of The Village Voice reacted with muted praise, highlighting Devo's "catchy, comical, herky-jerky rock and roll" while concluding: "In small doses it's as good as novelty music ever gets, and there isn't a really bad cut on this album. But it leads nowhere." Nonetheless, it was voted one of the best albums of the year in The Village Voices Pazz & Jop critics poll for 1978. In January 1980, Trouser Press also named it one of the best albums of 1978.

Later reception of the album has been more uniformly positive. Steve Huey of the online music database AllMusic termed it "arguably Devo's strongest set of material" and "a seminal touchstone in the development of American new wave." Q: Are We Not Men? A: We Are Devo! has scored on several "best of" lists, including Spins list of the "50 Most Essential Punk Records" and Pitchforks list of the 100 best albums of the 1970s.  It was ranked number 447 in Rolling Stones 2003 list of The 500 Greatest Albums of All Time, climbing to number 442 in the 2012 update and shooting up to number 252 in the 2020 reboot of the list. It is also listed in the book 1001 Albums You Must Hear Before You Die.

Record World said that the single "Come Back Jonee" "utilizes [Devo's] unique tongue-in-cheek approach to its maximum" and praised Eno's production.

Track listing

On the European version, the second song appears as "Satisfaction (I Can't Get Me No)".

Additional tracks

Personnel
Credits adapted from Pioneers Who Got Scalped: The Anthology CD liner notes:

Devo
 Mark Mothersbaugh – vocals, keyboards, guitar
 Gerald Casale – vocals, bass guitar, keyboards
 Bob Mothersbaugh – lead guitar, vocals
 Bob Casale – rhythm guitar, keyboards, vocals
 Alan Myers – drums

Credits adapted from the original album's liner notes (except where noted):

Technical
 Brian Eno – producer
 Conny Plank – engineer (tracks 1–8, 10), mixing
 Patrick Gleeson – engineer (tracks 9, 11)
 Bobbi Watson – production photograph
 Devo Inc. – devolved Computa-posite cover graphic, graphic concept and execution
 John Cabalka – graphic supervision
 Erik Munsön – package production design
 David Bowie – additional production and mixing

Tour 
To support the album, Devo undertook a lengthy world tour, lasting from October 1978 to June 1979. The look of the tour was largely based around the live act they'd been developing throughout the previous year, with the only differences being the increased budget allowing for higher quality costumes and a basic set, and a focus on the album's material, whilst teasing then unreleased songs for the next album.

The show would open with the band's 1976 short film The Truth About De-Evolution, followed by their 1978 promo videos for "Satisfaction" and "Come Back Jonee". When the band arrived on stage, they performed two songs that were not on the album supporting the tour. Then Mark Mothersbaugh would get a modified electric guitar, which would only be used for the songs "Satisfaction" and "Too Much Paranoias."

As the show would continue, the group's signature yellow suits would be gradually torn, until "Jocko Homo," where Devo would strip down to black shorts and T shirts with knee and shoulder pads. During the intro to "Smart Patrol", the group donned orange helmets, which were shaken off during the next song, "Mr. DNA." The show was ultimately concluded with lead singer Mark Mothersbaugh becoming Booji Boy and singing two songs: "Red Eye" and "The Words Get Stuck in My Throat."

Setlist 
 "Wiggly World"
 "Secret Agent Man" (only performed on second leg)
 "Pink Pussycat"
 "(I Can't Get No) Satisfaction"
 "Too Much Paranoias"
 "Praying Hands"
 "Uncontrollable Urge"
 "Mongoloid"
 "Jocko Homo"
 "Smart Patrol"
 "Mr. DNA"
 "Sloppy (I Saw My Baby Gettin')"
 "Come Back Jonee"
 "Gut Feeling"
 "Slap Your Mammy"
 "Devo Corporate Anthem"
 "Red Eye Express"
 "The Words Get Stuck in My Throat"

The following songs were also played during the tour, but only as one-offs:

 "Clockout"
 "Shrivel Up"
 "In Heaven Everything Is Fine"
 "I Need a Chick"

Chart performance

Certifications

Notes

References

External links

Q: Are We Not Men? A: We Are Devo! at Rate Your Music

1978 debut albums
Albums produced by David Bowie
Devo albums
Albums produced by Brian Eno
Warner Records albums
Virgin Records albums